Sicklinghall is a village and civil parish in North Yorkshire, England that is situated between the town of Wetherby ( to the east) and the village of Kirkby Overblow.

In 2007 the population was recorded as 300, increasing to 336 at the 2011 Census.

The village is surrounded by granges; on the eastern side lie Skerry Grange and Sicklinghall Grange and on the western Addlethorpe Grange. Sicklinghall Grange is set in a  estate, it is the UK residence of racehorse owner, Sir Robert Ogden. However the 'big house' is Stockeld Park, a Grade I-listed palladian villa that sits at the heart of a 2,000-acre estate and is home to the Grant family.

History
The village is referred to in the Domesday Book as "Sidingale", in the hundred of Burghshire in the West Riding, and the lord and tenant in chief is noted as the King. In Kirkby's Inquest (1284-5) the village is referred to as Siclinghalle; in the Knights' Fees of 1302 it is Sykelynghall, and in the Nomina Villarum (1316) it is written Sigglinghall.

There has been a school in the village of Sicklinghall since at least 1850 when Mrs Fenton Scott of Woodhall built a single storey school house.

There is a Roman Catholic convent situated by the Church of the Immaculate Conception and monastery dating from 1852 to the south of the village.

Public buildings and amenities
The village has two churches; St Peter's (Church of England), and the Church of the Immaculate Conception (Roman Catholic). There is a pub called The Scott's Arms, a primary school and a village hall. There are ponds at either end of the village.

Sports teams
Sicklinghall has a cricket team playing in the local Wetherby Cricket League. The ground is situated at the top of the village, the club having moved from nearby Stockeld Park in 2002.  In 2016 an arson attack on the cricket club destroyed the pavilion.

Celebrities
Former Leeds United and Aston Villa manager David O'Leary is a resident of Sicklinghall.

Sir Robert Ogden the racehorse owner currently resides in Sicklinghall.

References

External links

Villages in North Yorkshire
Civil parishes in North Yorkshire